Sergey Igorevich Stepanov (born 3 September 1984 in Tiraspol), commonly known as the Epic Sax Guy, Saxroll or Ultra Sax Guy, is a Moldovan musician and composer and a member of the SunStroke Project.

Biography 
Stepanov graduated in 2005 from Transnistrian State Arts Institute of Tiraspol. After graduation he was drafted into the Transnistrian army, where he met Anton Ragoza. Later they formed Sunstroke band, now known as SunStroke Project. Stepanov is dubbed 'Epic Sax Guy' by many on the internet.

SunStroke Project 
As a member of SunStroke Project, Sergey participated at the Eurovision Song Contest 2010 in Oslo, where SunStroke Project finished 22nd, with their song "Run Away". After the contest, Stepanov, thanks to his extravagant look and dancing style, quickly became an Internet meme named "Epic Sax Guy" through a YouTube video with Sergey's instrumental solo performance during the group's Eurovision performance.  It quickly went viral and spawned a number of remix videos, including a ten-hour long remixed version.

In 2014, Stepanov's 2010 performance was included in the Eurovision Book of Records, a collection of the most memorable moments in the history of the contest. In 2017, SunStroke Project returned to Eurovision with the song "Hey, Mamma!", and this time finished 3rd. Many notable publications around the world wrote about the comeback of the "Epic Sax Guy", and on the Internet new videos and remixes with Stepanov's performance appeared, this time known as "Ultra Sax Guy". On returning to Moldova, SunStroke Project were awarded the Order of Honour by then-President of Moldova Igor Dodon.

During the Eurovision Song Contest 2021 final, Stepanov was the spokesperson for the Moldovan jury votes.

Personal life 
Sergey is married to Olga Deleu, and they have a son, Mikhail.

Honours 
  Order of Honour (2017)

Notes

References

External links

 Биография на сайте группы 
 

1984 births
Living people
People from Tiraspol
Moldovan musicians
Moldovan composers
Male composers
Russian composers
Russian male composers
Saxophonists
Internet memes
21st-century saxophonists
Moldovan people of Russian descent
21st-century Russian male musicians
Eurovision Song Contest entrants of 2010
Eurovision Song Contest entrants of 2017
Eurovision Song Contest entrants for Moldova
Internet memes introduced in 2010